Chrysolarentia mecynata is a species of moth of the  family Geometridae. It is found in Australia.

The wingspan is about 20 mm.

References

Euphyia
Moths of Australia
Moths described in 1857